Jimtown is an unincorporated community located in the town of Akan, Richland County, Wisconsin, United States. The community was named for two local land owners: Jim Burns and Jim Bachtenkircher.

Notes

Unincorporated communities in Richland County, Wisconsin
Unincorporated communities in Wisconsin